Sar Tapeh castle is a historical castle located in Bandar-e Gaz County in Golestan Province.

References 

Castles in Iran